The 1804 United States presidential election in Maryland took place on an unknown date in 1804, as part of the 1804 presidential election. Voters chose eleven representatives, or electors to the Electoral College, who voted for President and Vice President.

Early elections were quite different from modern ones. Voters voted for individual electors, who were pledged to vote for certain candidates. Oftentimes, which candidate an elector intended to support was unclear. Prior to the ratification of the 12th amendment, each elector did not distinguish between a vote cast for President and Vice President, and simply cast two votes.

Starting with the 1796 United States presidential election and ending with the 1824 United States presidential election, Maryland used an electoral district system to choose its electors, with each district electing a single elector. This is similar to the way Nebraska and Maine choose their electors in modern elections.

Results

Results by electoral district

Results by county

Counties that flipped from Federalist to Democratic-Republican
Allegany
Calvert
Frederick
Montgomery
Prince George's

See also
 United States presidential elections in Maryland
 1804 United States presidential election
 1804 United States elections

Notes

References 

Maryland
1804
Presidential